Al-Shabab became the first club to win the championship for three seasons in succession when defeating Al-Hilal in the championship match.
Promoted side Al-Najma were relegated alongside Al-Ta'ee.

Stadia and locations

Final league table

Promoted: Ohud, Al-Nahda.

Playoffs

Semifinals

Third place match

Final

External links 
 RSSSF Stats
 Saudi Arabia Football Federation
 Saudi League Statistics

Saudi Premier League seasons
Saudi Professional League
Professional League